The State Intellectual Property Office of the Republic of Croatia (SIPO Croatia) is a government agency responsible for registration of patents, trademarks and design in Croatia. It was established in 1991, originally under the name "Republic Industrial Property Office" and then "State Patent Office". Since 1996, its name is "State Intellectual Property Office."

List of directors general

The following persons have held the office of Director General:

 Nikola Kopčić (1992 - 2002) 
 Hrvoje Junašević (2002 - 2004) 
 Željko Topić (2004 - 2012) 
 Ljiljana Kuterovac (2012 - )

References

External links

Law of Croatia
Patent offices
Trademark law organizations
Organizations established in 1991
1991 establishments in Croatia